Iliya Ventsislavov Milanov (born 19 February 1992) is a Bulgarian footballer who plays as a defender for Dunav Ruse. His twin brother Georgi Milanov is also a footballer.

Career

Litex Lovech
Born in Levski, Pleven Province, Milanov began playing football at the local club, before joined the Litex Lovech Academy, together with his twin brother Georgi, in 2005. He was part of a group of young players at the club who guided the club to win the Bulgarian U-17 Championship in June 2009.

On 3 December 2009, Milanov made his Litex first-team debut in a 4–0 away win over Pirin Gotse Delchev in the Bulgarian Cup, coming on as a substitute in the 72nd minute. He made his league debut in a 4–2 away win against Sportist Svoge at Chavdar Tsvetkov Stadium on 16 May 2010, in the final game of the 2009–10 A PFG season, playing the full 90 minutes.

During the 2011–12 season, Milanov formed a partnership with Nikolay Bodurov in the centre of defence and has become an established first team player. On 20 April 2013, he hit his first goal, scoring header in the 2–1 home loss against Levski Sofia.

On 5 January 2016 it was announced that left the club by terminating his contract with paying 3 paychecks, but later the same day Litex said that this is not possible and he can't cancel his contract and can't leave the club as free agent until 31 July 2017 when his contract ends and if he wants to move in other club they have to pay transfer fee. Still, the player left the club even after Litex announced they will sue him.

Beroe Stara Zagora
On 1 March 2016 Milanov signed with Beroe Stara Zagora.

Neftochimic Burgas
On 12 February 2017 Milanov signed with Neftochimic Burgas. He made his debut for the team on 1 March 2017 after coming on as a substitute and scoring the equalizer for the 1:1 draw against Ludogorets Razgrad.

Cherno More
On 12 September 2017, Milanov signed with Cherno More. He made his debut on 20 September in a 1–2 away defeat by Montana in the Bulgarian Cup's first round.

Botev Vratsa
On 27 September 2018, Milanov signed with Botev Vratsa, after having been released from Cherno More at the end of the previous season.

Septemvri Sofia
After 4 seasons with Botev, Milanov moved to Septemvri Sofia in June 2022.

International career
In 2010, Milanov was called up to the Bulgaria under-21 team for the first time, making his competitive debut on 3 March, in a 0–2 loss against Montenegro U21. He made his debut for the senior team on 12 October 2012 in a 1–1 draw against Denmark, substituting Georgi Iliev.

Career statistics

Club

National team

Honours

Litex Lovech
 Bulgarian A PFG (2): 2009–10, 2010–11
 Bulgarian Supercup (1): 2010

References

External links
 
 

1992 births
Living people
Bulgarian footballers
Bulgaria youth international footballers
Bulgaria under-21 international footballers
Bulgaria international footballers
PFC Litex Lovech players
PFC Beroe Stara Zagora players
Neftochimic Burgas players
PFC Cherno More Varna players
FC Septemvri Sofia players
First Professional Football League (Bulgaria) players
Second Professional Football League (Bulgaria) players
Association football defenders
Bulgarian twins
Twin sportspeople
People from Levski, Pleven Province